Fort Branch may refer to:

Fort Branch, a Confederate fort
Fort Branch, Indiana, a town in Gibson County
Fort Branch (Missouri), a stream in Missouri
Fort Branch, West Virginia, an unincorporated community in Logan County